Lichinella is a genus of lichen-forming fungi in the family Lichinaceae. It was circumscribed in 1872 by Finnish lichenologist William Nylander. Five species are accepted by Species Fungorum (in the Catalogue of Life).

Species
 Lichinella algerica 
 Lichinella americana 
 Lichinella applanata 
 Lichinella cribellifera 
 Lichinella flexa 
 Lichinella granulosa 
 Lichinella heppii 
 Lichinella hondoana 
 Lichinella inflata 
 Lichinella intermedia 
 Lichinella jodopulchra 
 Lichinella lojkana 
 Lichinella mauritanica 
 Lichinella melamphylla 
 Lichinella minnesotensis 
 Lichinella myriospora 
 Lichinella polyspora 
 Lichinella robusta 
 Lichinella robustoides 
 Lichinella sinaica 
 Lichinella stipatula 
 Lichinella undulata

References

Lichinomycetes
Lichen genera
Ascomycota genera
Taxa named by William Nylander (botanist)
Taxa described in 1873